{{DISPLAYTITLE:C18H12}}
The molecular formula C18H12 may refer to:

 Benz[a]anthracene, or benzo[a]anthracene
 Benzo[c]phenanthrene
 Chrysene
 Tetracene, also called naphthacene
 Triphenylene